John E. Moran (August 23, 1856 – November 7, 1930) was a captain in the United States Army and a Medal of Honor recipient for his actions in the Philippine–American War. He lived and is buried in Great Falls, Montana.

Medal of Honor citation
Rank and organization: Captain, Company L, 37th Infantry, U.S. Volunteers. Place and date: Near Mabitac, Laguna, Luzon, Philippine Islands, September 17, 1900. Entered service at: Cascade County, Mont. Born: August 23, 1856, Vernon, Windham County, Vt. Date of issue: June 10, 1910.

Citation: 

After the attacking party had become demoralized, fearlessly led a small body of troops under a severe fire and through water waist deep in the attack against the enemy.

See also
List of Medal of Honor recipients
List of Philippine–American War Medal of Honor recipients

References

External links

1856 births
1930 deaths
People from Vernon, Vermont
United States Army officers
American military personnel of the Philippine–American War
United States Army Medal of Honor recipients
Philippine–American War recipients of the Medal of Honor